New Zealand and Argentina have been playing each other in the sport of Rugby Union since 1976.

New Zealand first sent a team, a New Zealand XV rather than the top All Blacks team, to play against Argentina (Los Pumas) on 30 October 1976. Argentina credited its own players with test match caps for both games on that tour, and for two games against the New Zealand XV when Argentina toured New Zealand in 1979. The New Zealand XV won all these matches.

The first Test Match that was recognised by both national unions was held on 26 October 1985, when the top level All Blacks toured Argentina.

In full Tests, the teams have met 35 times. The All Blacks have won 32 times, with the Pumas winning 2 and 1 match drawn. Argentina claimed their first ever win over the All Blacks with a 25–15 victory in Sydney Australia on 14 November 2020. These games have included three meetings at the Rugby World Cup, the teams having been in the same pool at the inaugural tournament in 1987, then at the quarter-finals in 2011 and then again in the pool stage in 2015.

Since 2012, the teams have met twice annually in The Rugby Championship (formerly known as the Tri Nations before Argentina's entry in the 2012 Tournament as the fourth participating team). The 2015 Championship was an exception, with each side playing the others only once in an abbreviated edition of The Rugby Championship, due to that year's Rugby World Cup.

Summary
Note: Summary below does not include the four Los Pumas versus New Zealand XV matches from 1976 to 1979, which only Argentina recognizes as tests.

Overall

Records
Note: Date shown in brackets indicates when the record was or last set.

Results

XV Results
Below is a list of matches that Argentina has awarded matches test match status by virtue of awarding caps, but New Zealand did not award caps, as the governing New Zealand Rugby Union had sent a New Zealand XV rather than the top All Blacks team.

Not classed as a full international by New Zealand, who fielded a New Zealand XV rather than the All Blacks:

List of series

References

External links 
 Pick and Go Rugby Test Match Statistics

 
New Zealand national rugby union team matches
Argentina national rugby union team matches
Rugby union rivalries in New Zealand
Rugby union rivalries in Argentina